Bratenahl is a village in Cuyahoga County, Ohio, United States, on the southern shore of Lake Erie. One of Cleveland's oldest streetcar suburbs, it is bordered by the city on three sides and by the Lake Erie shoreline to the north. The population was 1,197 at the 2010 census.

History
Incorporated in 1903, Bratenahl was named after its founder, Charles Bratenahl.  It is one of the older residential suburbs of Cleveland along with Shaker Heights, Lakewood, and Cleveland Heights; of these, Bratenahl has the highest per capita wealth. Bratenahl is a small community of fewer than 1,200 population inhabiting approximately 700 households, some of which are stately estates, townhouses, and condominiums on the lakefront.  Its famous Lake Shore Boulevard has been featured in many magazines including Better Homes and Gardens.

Bratenahl is home to a once controversial luxury high-rise condominium complex named Bratenahl Place. Though many residents opposed it at the time, in 1967 two large multi-occupancy buildings of brutalist architectural design were built on the lakefront. One of the two structures was originally intended to be a 180-unit rental apartment building, while the other, smaller one was a condominium from its inception. In 1976 however, the larger one also became a condominium.

Bratenahl was the subject of a joint Marshall Project and WEWS investigation that found that the majority of drivers cited for traffic violations by the Bratenahl police were Black. The report found that Bratenahl village had assessed more than $700,000 in fines, court costs, and other revenue since 2020, mostly from Black drivers passing through the village's jurisdiction.

Geography
Bratenahl is located at  (41.554275, −81.604574).

Demographics

2010 census
As of the census of 2010, there were 1,197 people, 679 households, and 333 families living in the village. The racial makeup of the village was 80.5% White, 15.5% African American, 0.3% Native American, 2.5% Asian, 0.3% from other races, and 0.9% from two or more races. Hispanic or Latino of any race were 0.9% of the population.

There were 679 households, of which 7.4% had children under the age of 18 living with them, 42.1% were married couples living together, 5.3% had a female householder with no husband present, 1.6% had a male householder with no wife present, and 51.0% were non-families. 42.7% of all households were made up of individuals, and 16% had someone living alone who was 65 years of age or older. The average household size was 1.75 and the average family size was 2.32.

The median age in the village was 57.8 years. 6.5% of residents were under the age of 18; 4% were between the ages of 18 and 24; 16.4% were from 25 to 44; 42.2% were from 45 to 64; and 31.1% were 65 years of age or older. The gender makeup of the village was 48.6% male and 51.4% female.

Of the village's population over the age of 25, 62.4% hold a bachelor's degree or higher.

2000 census
As of the census of 2000, there were 1,337 people, 711 households, and 363 families living in the village. The population density was 1,304.1 people per square mile (501.2/km2). There were 800 housing units at an average density of 780.3 per square mile (299.9/km2). The racial makeup of the village was 86.82% White, 10.34% African American, 0.07% Native American, 0.75% Asian, 0.22% from other races, and 1.80% from two or more races. Hispanic or Latino of any race were 1.12% of the population.

There were 711 households, out of which 11.8% had children under the age of 18 living with them, 43.7% were married couples living together, 5.5% had a female householder with no husband present, and 48.9% were non-families. 40.9% of all households were made up of individuals, and 15.9% had someone living alone who was 65 years of age or older. The average household size was 1.87 and the average family size was 2.50.

In the village, the population was spread out, with 11.4% under the age of 18, 3.4% from 18 to 24, 21.8% from 25 to 44, 36.2% from 45 to 64, and 27.2% who were 65 years of age or older. The median age was 51 years. For every 100 females there were 93.2 males. For every 100 females age 18 and over, there were 90.8 males.

The median income for a household in the village was $76,028, and the median income for a family was $104,987. Males had a median income of $61,250 versus $46,563 for females. The per capita income for the village was $72,757.  About 1.6% of families and 4.3% of the population were below the poverty line, including 4.1% of those under the age of 18 and 2.7% of those ages 65 or older.

Notable people
 Jim Backus, actor and comedian
 Richard Fleischman, architect
 Margaret Hamilton, actress best known for The Wizard of Oz
 Eliot Ness, law enforcement agent
 Kevin Love, basketball player
 Tristan Thompson, basketball player

References

External links
 Village website

Villages in Cuyahoga County, Ohio
Villages in Ohio
Ohio populated places on Lake Erie
Cleveland metropolitan area